Chief Executive elections were held in Macau on 15 May 1999 to elect the first Chief Executive (CE), the highest office of the Macau Special Administrative Region, before Macau was due to be handed back to China by Portugal. Edmund Ho was elected as the first leader of the Macau SAR. This was the only contested Chief Executive election to date.

Candidates
Edmund Ho Hau-wah, former member of the Selection Committee of Macau Special Administrative Region Government
Stanley Au Chong-kit, former member of the Selection Committee of Macau Special Administrative Region Government

Results

Reactions
Edmund Ho thanked the Selection Committee and Macanese residents for their support after elected as Chief Executive and vowed to uphold "One Country Two Systems" framework. Governor of Macau Vasco Joaquim Rocha Vieira, the then-leader of the city, congratulated Ho's win and promised a smooth handover of sovereignty.

Despite some regarded Au as a democrat challenging the one-man election, Stanley Au was later appointed to the Legislative Assembly by Ho after SAR established, and joined Chinese People's Political Consultative Conference in 2005. In 2019, Au described his bid, which made the only contested Chief Executive election in Macau as of now, as naïve.

References

Macau
Chief Executive
Macau
Chief Executive elections in Macau